The Mount Sequoyah Cottages are a pair of historic summer cabins at 808 and 810 East Skyline Drive in Fayetteville, Arkansas. They were built in the 1920s, around the time that the adjacent Mount Sequoyah Methodist summer camp was developed, and represent a period when the "back to nature" movement was a leading element in the development of summer properties.

The cottages were listed on the National Register of Historic Places in 2012.

See also

National Register of Historic Places listings in Washington County, Arkansas

References

Historic districts on the National Register of Historic Places in Arkansas
National Register of Historic Places in Fayetteville, Arkansas
Residential buildings completed in 1920
Residential buildings on the National Register of Historic Places in Arkansas
1920 establishments in Arkansas